Grapevine leafroll-associated virus 1 (GRLaV-1) is a virus infecting grapevine in the genus Ampelovirus.

See also 
 List of viruses

References

External links 
 uniprot.org/taxonomy

Closteroviridae
Viral grape diseases